This list of medical schools in Canada includes major academic institutions that award the Doctor of Medicine (M.D.) degree, which is required to become a physician or a surgeon in Canada. M.D. granting medical schools are jointly accredited by the Committee on Accreditation of Canadian Medical Schools (CACMS) and the U.S. Liaison Committee on Medical Education. There are 17 accredited medical schools in Canada.

List of medical schools

Former medical schools

Proposed medical schools

See also
 Medical school in Canada
 List of medical schools

References

External links
 Liaison Committee on Medical Education accredited medical schools
 Medical school seeking Liaison Committee on Medical Education accreditation
 World Directory of Medical Schools

Canada